Zard is a village in Ghazi Rural District, Samalqan District, Maneh and Samalqan County, North Khorasan Province, Iran. At the 2006 census, its population was 2,291, in 588 families.

References 

Populated places in Maneh and Samalqan County